Everything and More may refer to:
 Everything and More (book), a 2003 book by the American novelist and essayist David Foster Wallace
 Everything and More (Michelle Wright album)
 Everything and More (Billy Gilman album)
 Everything and More (Natalia album)
 Everything and More (StorySide:B album)
 "Everything and More" (song), a 1993 song by Canadian country music artist Jim Witter